Jack McAuliffe (March 24, 1866 – November 5, 1937) was an Irish-American boxer who fought mostly out of Williamsburg, Brooklyn. Nicknamed "The Napoleon of the Ring," McAuliffe is one of only fifteen world boxing champions to retire without a loss. He was the first boxer to hold the World Lightweight championship from 1886 to 1893. He was the first European boxer to retire as an undefeated World Champion.

He was inducted into The Ring Boxing Hall of Fame in 1954 and the International Boxing Hall of Fame in 1995.

Early life

McAuliffe's parents were Cornelius McAuliffe and Jane Bailey, who were living at 5 Christ Church Lane, Cork, Ireland (then part of the United Kingdom), at the time of Jack's birth. McAuliffe emigrated to the United States in 1871, where he spent his early years in Bangor, Maine.

Amateur and professional career
He made his first appearance as an amateur boxer in 1883. He turned professional soon after, fighting Jem Carney 78 rounds to a draw at Revere Beach, Massachusetts. He fought Billy Dacey for the lightweight championship and a $5,000 purse in 1888, and knocked him out in eleven rounds. He was known as a strong two-handed fighter with "cat-like" reflexes.  In 1897 he successfully defended his title against Billy Myer in a highly publicized match at the Olympic Club, New Orleans .

Personal life

McAuliffe was married twice, both times to stage actresses. His first wife was Katie Hart, who played in farce comedies. After her death, McAuliffe married Catherine Rowe in 1894, whose stage name was Pearl Inman, of the song and dance team The Inman Sisters. Between marriages he dated a third actress, Sadie McDonald. McAuliffe and Rowe moved back to Bangor, Maine, in 1894, where he undertook preliminary training for a fight later that year at the Seaside Athletic Club on Coney Island.

Death and retirement from the ring
McAuliffe retired in 1897. According to the International Boxing Hall of Fame, he had 36 professional fights. McAuliffe was undefeated with 30 bouts, 22 by knockout. He had five draws, one no decision. He successfully defended his world lightweight title against six different boxers.

He died on November 5, 1937, at his home on Austin Street in Forest Hills, Queens.

Professional boxing record

All newspaper decisions are officially regarded as “no decision” bouts and are not counted in the win/loss/draw column.

See also
List of lightweight boxing champions

References

External links

McAuliffe's Record at Cyber Boxing Zone
McAuliffe at IBHOF

|-

1866 births
1937 deaths
Bare-knuckle boxers
Boxers from Maine
International Boxing Hall of Fame inductees
Irish male boxers
Irish emigrants to the United States (before 1923)
People from Forest Hills, Queens
Sportspeople from Bangor, Maine
Sportspeople from Cork (city)
World lightweight boxing champions
Undefeated world boxing champions
19th-century Irish people
American male boxers